Serge Biwole Abolo (born 2 August 1975) is a Cameroonian former judoka. He competed in the men's middleweight event at the 1996 Summer Olympics.

References

External links
 

1975 births
Living people
Cameroonian male judoka
Olympic judoka of Cameroon
Judoka at the 1996 Summer Olympics
Place of birth missing (living people)
20th-century Cameroonian people
21st-century Cameroonian people
African Games medalists in judo
Competitors at the 1995 All-Africa Games
African Games silver medalists for Cameroon
African Games bronze medalists for Cameroon